Chou Chen Hsiu-hsia (born 14 January 1958) is a Taiwanese politician.

Education and personal life
Chou Chen Hsiu-hsia attended  in Guantian, Tainan. She is married to Chou Wu-liu.

Political career
She was elected to the Legislative Yuan via party list proportional representation in 2016, as a member of the People First Party. During her first term in office, Chou Chen took an interest in agriculture and government expenditures. She has been critical of the Transitional Justice Commission.

References

1958 births
Living people
21st-century Taiwanese women politicians
Members of the 9th Legislative Yuan
Party List Members of the Legislative Yuan
People First Party Members of the Legislative Yuan
Politicians of the Republic of China on Taiwan from Tainan
Spouses of Taiwanese politicians